is a Japanese manga series written by Yuki Amemiya and Yukino Ichihara.  The series is published in English by Seven Seas Entertainment.

Plot
The story follows Kokuryuu Kaguya as he joins the Battle Rabbits, an organization dedicated to protecting Earth from monsters, to get revenge against the demons who killed his father.

Release
Yuki Amemiya and Yukino Ichihara, the authors of 07-Ghost, began publishing the series in Ichijinsha's Monthly Comic Zero Sum on 28 September 2014.

North American manga publisher Seven Seas Entertainment announced their license to the series on 4 September 2015.

Volumes

References

External links

  at Seven Seas Entertainment
 

Ichijinsha manga
Seven Seas Entertainment titles
Josei manga
Action anime and manga